Roy Lee Riales Sr. (December 24, 1909 – November 1, 1985) was an American politician. He was a member of the Arkansas House of Representatives, serving from 1939 to 1948. He was a member of the Democratic party.

References

1985 deaths
1909 births
People from Polk County, Arkansas
20th-century American politicians
Speakers of the Arkansas House of Representatives
Democratic Party members of the Arkansas House of Representatives